Battle of Zahal (June 17–18, 1649) was a battle of the Khmelnytsky Uprising. Polish–Lithuanian Commonwealth forces under the command of Władysław Wołłowicz defeated the Ukrainian Cossack forces under the command of Ilja Hołota, who was killed in battle.

References
Poleskie ostatki. W: Grzegorz Rąkowski: Czar Polesia. Pruszków: Oficyna Wydawnicza "Rewasz", 2005, p. 486, seria: Smak Kresów. .
Piotr Borawski: Tatarzy w dawnej Rzeczypospolitej. Warszawa: Ludowa Spółdzielnia Wydawnicza, 1986, p. 134. .
Tomasz Ciesielski: Od Batohu do Żwańca. Wojna na Ukrainie i w księstwach naddunajskich 1652–1653. Warszawa: „Inforteditions”, 2008. .
Henryk Wisner Janusz Radziwiłł 1612–1655, Wydawnictwo MADA, Warszawa 2000

Conflicts in 1649
1649 in Europe
Zahal